Kampong Cham is a province of Cambodia located on the central lowlands of the Mekong River. It borders the provinces of Kampong Chhnang to the west, Kampong Thom and Kratié to the north, Tboung Khmum to the east, and Prey Veng and Kandal to the south. Kampong Cham was officially divided into two provinces on 31 December 2013 in what was seen by many as a political move by the ruling party.  All land west of the Mekong remained Kampong Cham while land east of the river became Tbong Khmum province. Prior to this division, Kampong Cham extended eastward to the international border with Vietnam, was the eleventh largest province in Cambodia, and with a population of 1,680,694, was the most populous province in Cambodia. Its capital and largest city is Kampong Cham.

Etymology

Kampong Cham means "Port of the Chams" in Khmer. Kampong means port or harbor. Cham refers to the ethnic Cham people living in the province. The word kampong in Cham is shared in other Austronesian languages, but in Malay and Indonesian it means village and is generally spelled kampung. A symbol the province is known for is two snakes wrapped around each other, which is located at the capital city bridge, Kampong Cham.

Geography
 
Kampong Cham is primarily lowlands. The main river is the Mekong River, which forms the eastern border of the province, separating it from Tbong Khmum province.

Administration 

Kampong Cham is subdivided into 9 districts and 1 municipality which in turn are subdivided into communes (khum) which are further divided into villages (phum). The province formerly consisted of 16 districts, however a request by Hun Sen's government to split the province in two was made after his ruling Cambodian People's Party (CPP) lost the province to the opposition in the July 2013 elections. The CPP won only eight of the available 18 National Assembly seats in Hun Sen's home province. The request, which was ostensibly made in order to improve administrative efficiency in the large province, was approved by King Sihamoni on 31 December 2013. The 10 districts that remain in Kampong Cham province overwhelmingly voted for the opposition Cambodia National Rescue Party, led by Sam Rainsy, while five of the six districts cut out from Kampong Cham to form Tboung Khmum province were won solidly by the CPP.

2 districts in south Mekong river are Koh Sotin and Steung Trang

Politics
 
Kampong Cham is allocated 10 seats in the National Assembly, down from 18. It had been the largest constituency until 2018.

Notable people
Bun Rany, President of Cambodian Red Cross
Hang Thun Hak, former Prime Minister 
Hem Heng, diplomat 
Heng Samrin, Speaker of the National Assembly 
Hun Manet, son of Hun Sen  
Hun Neang, father of Hun Sen 
Hun Sen, Prime Minister 
In Tam, former Prime Minister 
Keng Vannsak, author 
Kong Korm, Senator 
Say Chhum, President of the Senate 
Sim Var, former Prime Minister

See also 
 Wat Moha Leap
 Khmer people 
 Cham people
 Champa
 Kampong Cham (city), the capital city of Kampong Cham province.

References

External links
Map

 
Provinces of Cambodia